The 2018–19 Syracuse Orange women's basketball team represents Syracuse University during the 2018–19 NCAA Division I women's basketball season. The Orange, led by twelfth year head coach Quentin Hillsman. The Orange were sixth year members of the Atlantic Coast Conference and play their home games at the Carrier Dome. They finished the season 25–9, 11–5 in ACC play to finish in fifth place. They advanced to the semifinals of the ACC women's tournament where they lost to Notre Dame. They received an at-large bid to the NCAA women's tournament, receiving a No. 3 seed in the Portland regional, where they defeated Fordham in the first round before being upset by South Dakota State in the second round.

Previous season
For the 2017–18 season, the Orange finished 10–6 in ACC play and 22–9 overall. Their record achieved a tie for sixth in the ACC. Syracuse was eliminated in the second round of the ACC tournament by Virginia Tech. The Orange received an at-large bid to the NCAA tournament as an eight-seed, they lost in the first round to Oklahoma State.

Off-season

Recruiting Class

Source:

Roster

Schedule

|-
!colspan=9 style="background:#D44500; color:#212B6D;"|Non-conference regular season

|-
!colspan=9 style="background:#D44500; color:#212B6D;"| ACC regular season

|-
!colspan=9 style="background:#D44500; color:#212B6D;"| ACC Women's Tournament

|-
!colspan=9 style=| NCAA Women's Tournament

Rankings

The Coaches Poll releases a final poll after the NCAA tournament, but the AP Poll does not release a poll at this time.

See also
 2018–19 Syracuse Orange men's basketball team

References

Syracuse Orange women's basketball seasons
Syracuse
Syracuse basketball, women
Syracuse basketball, women
Syracuse